Slovakia competed at the 2022 Winter Paralympics in Beijing, China which took place between 4–13 March 2022.

Medalists
The following Slovakian competitors won medals at the games. In the discipline sections below, the medalists' names are bolded.

| width="56%" align="left" valign="top" |

| width="22%" align="left" valign="top" |

Competitors
The following is the list of number of competitors in the Games.

Alpine skiing

Slovakia competed in alpine skiing.

Men

Women

Para ice hockey

Slovakia competed in para ice hockey.

Summary

Preliminary round

Wheelchair curling

Slovakia competed in wheelchair curling.

Summary

Round robin

Draw 1
Saturday, March 5, 14:35

Draw 3
Sunday, March 6, 9:35

Draw 5
Sunday, March 6, 19:35

Draw 8
Monday, March 7, 19:35

Draw 10
Tuesday, March 8, 14:35

Draw 11
Tuesday, March 8, 19:35

Draw 12
Wednesday, March 9, 9:35

Draw 13
Wednesday, March 9, 14:35

Draw 15
Thursday, March 10, 9:35

Draw 17
Thursday, March 10, 19:35

Semifinal
Friday, March 11, 14:35

Bronze match

See also
Slovakia at the Paralympics
Slovakia at the 2022 Winter Olympics

References

Nations at the 2022 Winter Paralympics
2022
Winter Paralympics